An incentive is something that motivates an individual to perform an action.

Incentive  may also refer to:

 Incentive Software, a former British video game developer
 Incentive Records, in the music business
 "The Incentive", an episode of the American comedy television series The Office
 Incentivise, Australian thoroughbred racehorse

See also
 
 
 Incentive theory (disambiguation)